Sean, Shawn, or Shaun Davis may refer to:

Sportspeople

American football
Sean Davis (American football) (born 1993), American football player, NFL safety
Shawn Davis (American football) (born 1997), American football player, NFL safety
Shawn Davis, member of 2014 Delaware Fightin' Blue Hens football team

Other sportspeople
Sean Davis (footballer) (born 1979), English footballer
Sean Davis (soccer) (born 1993), American soccer player
Shaun Davis, bodybuilder

Others
Sean Davis, co-founder of the website The Federalist
Shawn Davis, musician in Stonehoney
Shawn Davis on List of hazing deaths in the United States
Philip "Sean" Davis, candidate in the Portland, Oregon mayoral election, 2016

See also
Sean Davies (disambiguation)
Shaun Davey (born 1948), Irish composer